Smuggling is the illegal transportation of objects, substances, information or people, such as out of a house or buildings, into a prison, or across an international border, in violation of applicable laws or other regulations. More broadly, social scientists define smuggling as the purposeful movement across a border in contravention to the relevant legal frameworks.

There are various motivations to smuggle. These include the participation in illegal trade, such as in the drug trade, illegal weapons trade, prostitution, human trafficking, kidnapping, exotic wildlife trade, art theft, blood diamonds, heists, chop shops, illegal immigration or illegal emigration, tax evasion, import/export restrictions, providing contraband to prison inmates, or the theft of the items being smuggled.

Smuggling is a common theme in literature, from Bizet's opera Carmen to the James Bond spy books (and later films) Diamonds Are Forever and Goldfinger.

Etymology
The verb smuggle, from Low German smuggeln or Dutch smokkelen (="to transport (goods) illegally"), apparently a frequentative formation of a word meaning "to sneak", most likely entered the English language during the 1600s–1700s.
Smuggling has a long and controversial history, probably dating back to the first time at which duties were imposed in any form, or any attempt was made to prohibit a form of traffic. Smuggling is often associated with efforts by authorities to prevent the importation of certain contraband items or non-taxed goods; however, there has also been smuggling based on illegally exporting goods. In England smuggling first became a recognised problem in the 13th century, following the creation of a national customs collection system by Edward I in 1275. Medieval smuggling tended to focus on the export of highly taxed export goods — notably wool and hides. Merchants also, however, sometimes smuggled other goods to circumvent prohibitions or embargoes on particular trades. Grain, for instance, was usually prohibited from export, unless prices were low, because of fears that grain exports would raise the price of food in England and thus cause food shortages and/or civil unrest. Following the loss of Gascony to the French in 1453, imports of wine were also sometimes embargoed during wars to try and deprive the French of the revenues that could be earned from their main export.

Most studies of historical smuggling have been based on official sources — such as court records, or the letters of Revenue Officers. A senior academic of the University of Bristol states that they only detail the activities of those dumb enough to get caught. This has led him and others, such as Prof. H. V. Bowen of the University of Swansea to use commercial records to reconstruct smuggling businesses. Jones' study focuses on smuggling in Bristol in the mid-16th century, arguing that the illicit export of goods like grain and leather represented a significant part of the city's business, with many members of the civic elite engaging in it, whether by disguised/hidden transport or mis-description of goods. Grain smuggling by members of the civic elite, often working closely with corrupt customs officers, has also been shown to have been prevalent in East Anglia during the later 16th century.

In England wool was smuggled to the continent in the 17th century, under the pressure of high excise taxes. In 1724 Daniel Defoe wrote of Lymington, Hampshire, on the south coast of England
"I do not find they have any foreign commerce, except it be what we call smuggling and roguing; which I may say, is the reigning commerce of all this part of the English coast, from the mouth of the Thames to the Land's End in Cornwall."

The high rates of duty levied on tea and also wine and spirits, and other luxury goods coming in from mainland Europe at this time made the clandestine import of such goods and the evasion of the duty a highly profitable venture for impoverished fishermen and seafarers. In certain parts of the country such as the Romney Marsh, East Kent, Cornwall and East Cleveland, the smuggling industry was for many communities more economically significant than legal activities such as farming and fishing. The principal reason for the high duty was the need for the government to finance a number of extremely expensive wars with France and the United States.

Before the era of drug smuggling and human trafficking, smuggling had acquired a kind of nostalgic romanticism, in the vein of Robert Louis Stevenson's Kidnapped:

"Few places on the British coast did not claim to be the haunts of wreckers or mooncussers. The thievery was boasted about and romanticized until it seemed a kind of heroism. It did not have any taint of criminality and the whole of the south coast had pockets vying with one another over whose smugglers were the darkest or most daring. The Smugglers Inn was one of the commonest names for a bar on the coast".

In North America, smuggling in colonial times was a reaction to the heavy taxes and regulations imposed by mercantilist trade policies. After American independence in 1783, smuggling developed at the edges of the United States at places like Passamaquoddy Bay, St. Mary's in Georgia, Lake Champlain, and Louisiana. During Thomas Jefferson's embargo of 1807-1809, these same places became the primary places where goods were smuggled out of the nation in defiance of the law. Like Britain, a gradual liberalization of trade laws as part of the free trade movement meant less smuggling. in 1907 President Theodore Roosevelt tried to cut down on smuggling by establishing the Roosevelt Reservation along the United States-Mexico Border. Smuggling revived in the 1920s during Prohibition, and drug smuggling became a major problem after 1970. In the 1990s, when economic sanctions were imposed on Serbia, a large percent of the population lived off smuggling petrol and consumer goods from neighboring countries. The state unofficially allowed this to continue or otherwise the entire economy would have collapsed.

In modern times, as many first-world countries have struggled to contain a rising influx of immigrants, the smuggling of people across national borders has become a lucrative extra-legal activity, as well as the extremely dark side, people-trafficking, especially of women who may be enslaved typically as prostitutes.

Types of smuggling

Goods

Much smuggling occurs when enterprising merchants attempt to supply demand for a good or service that is illegal or heavily taxed. As a result, illegal drug trafficking, and the smuggling of weapons (illegal arms trade), as well as the historical staples of smuggling, alcohol (rum-running) and tobacco, are widespread. As the smuggler faces significant risk of civil and criminal penalties if caught with contraband, smugglers are able to impose a significant price premium on smuggled goods. The profits involved in smuggling goods appear to be extensive. The iron law of prohibition dictates that greater enforcement results in more potent alcohol and drugs being smuggled.

Profits also derive from avoiding taxes or levies on imported goods. For example, a smuggler might purchase a large quantity of cigarettes in a place with low taxes and smuggle them into a place with higher taxes, where they can be sold at a far higher margin than would otherwise be possible. It has been reported that smuggling one truckload of cigarettes within the United States can lead to a profit of US$2 million.

People smuggling

With regard to people smuggling, a distinction can be made between people smuggling as a service to those wanting to illegally migrate and the involuntary trafficking of people. An estimated 90% of people who illegally crossed the border between Mexico and the United States are believed to have paid a smuggler to lead them across.

People smuggling can be used to rescue a person from oppressive circumstances. For example, when the Southern United States allowed slavery, many slaves moved north via the Underground Railroad. Similarly, during the Holocaust, Jewish people were smuggled out of Germany by people such as Algoth Niska.

Human trafficking

Trafficking of human beings — sometimes called human trafficking or, in the case of sexual services, sex trafficking — is not the same as people smuggling. A smuggler will facilitate illegal entry into a country for a fee, and on arrival at their destination, the smuggled person is free; the trafficking victim is coerced in some way. Victims do not agree to be trafficked; they are tricked, lured by false promises, or forced into it. Traffickers use coercive tactics including deception, fraud, intimidation, isolation, physical threats and use of force, debt bondage or even force-feeding drugs to control their victims.

While the majority of victims are women, and sometimes children, other victims include men, women and children forced or conned into manual or cheap labor. Due to the illegal nature of trafficking, the exact extent is unknown. A U.S. government report published in 2003 estimates that 800,000-900,000 people worldwide are trafficked across borders each year. This figure does not include those who are trafficked internally.

Child trafficking

According to a study by Alternatives to Combat Child Labour Through Education and Sustainable Services in the Middle East and North Africa Region (ACCESS-MENA) 30% of school children living in border villages of Yemen had been smuggled into Saudi Arabia.  Child trafficking is commonly referenced as "transporting". Smuggled children were in danger of being sexually abused or even killed. Poverty is one of the reasons behind child trafficking and some children are smuggled with their parents' consent via a transporter. As many as 50% of those smuggled are children. In the Philippines, between 60,000 and 100,000 children are trafficked to work in the sex industry.

Human trafficking and migration
Each year, hundreds of thousands of migrants are moved illegally by highly organized international smuggling and trafficking groups, often in dangerous or inhumane conditions. This phenomenon has been growing in recent years as people of low income countries are aspiring to enter developed countries in search of jobs. Migrant smuggling and human trafficking are two separate offences and differ in a few central respects. While "smuggling" refers to facilitating the illegal entry of a person into a State, "trafficking" includes an element of exploitation.

The trafficker retains control over the migrant—through force, fraud or coercion—typically in the sex industry, through forced labour or through other practices similar to slavery. Trafficking violates the idea of basic human rights. The overwhelming majority of those trafficked are women and children. These victims are commodities in a multibillion-dollar global industry. Criminal organizations are choosing to traffic human beings because, unlike other commodities, people can be used repeatedly and because trafficking requires little in terms of capital investment.

Smuggling is also reaping huge financial dividends to criminal groups who charge migrants massive fees for their services. Intelligence reports have noted that drug-traffickers and other criminal organizations are switching to human cargo to obtain greater profit with less risk.

It is acknowledged that the smuggling of people is a growing global phenomenon. It is a transnational crime. Currently, economic instability appears to be the main reason for illegal migration movement throughout the world. Nevertheless, many of the willing migrants undertake the hazardous travel to their destination country with criminal syndicates specialized in people smuggling. These syndicates arrange everything for the migrants, but at a high price.

Very often the traveling conditions are inhumane: the migrants are overcrowded in trucks or boats and fatal accidents occur frequently. After their arrival in the destination country, their illegal status puts them at the mercy of their smugglers, which often force the migrants to work for years in the illegal labor market to pay off the debts incurred as a result of their transportation.

Wildlife

Wildlife smuggling results from the demand for exotic species and the lucrative nature of the trade. The CITES (Convention on International Trade in Endangered Species of Wild Fauna and Flora) regulates the movement of endangered wildlife across political borders.

Economics of smuggling

Research on smuggling as economic phenomenon is scant. Jagdish Bhagwati and Bent Hansen first forwarded a theory of smuggling in which they saw smuggling essentially as an import-substituting economic activity. Their main consideration, however, was the welfare implications of smuggling. Against common belief that the private sector is more efficient than the public sector, they showed that smuggling might not enhance social welfare though it may divert resources from governments to the private sector.

In contrast, Faizul Latif Chowdhury, in 1999, suggested a production-substituting model of smuggling in which price disparity due to cost of supply is critically important as an incentive for smuggling. This price disparity is caused by domestic consumption-taxes and import duties. Drawing attention to the case of cigarettes, Chowdhury suggested that, in Bangladesh,  smuggling of cigarettes reduced the level of domestic production. Domestic production of cigarettes is subject to value added tax (VAT) and other consumption tax. Reduction of domestic taxes enables the local producer to supply at a lower cost and bring down the price disparity that encourages smuggling.

However, Chowdhury suggested that there is a limit beyond which reducing domestic taxes on production cannot confer a competitive advantage versus smuggled cigarettes. Therefore, government needs to upscale its anti-smuggling drive so that seizures (taking possession of person or property by legal process) can add to the cost of smuggling and thus render smuggling uncompetitive. Notably, Chowdhury modeled the relationship of the smuggler to the local producer as one of antagonistic duopoly.

On the other hand, research by Tat Chee Tsui in 2016 suggests that even if increasing  cigarette duty may encourage smuggling, total cigarette-consumption still declines because the price of illicit goods, as substitutes of taxed cigarettes, also increases because of higher tax rate.

One economic view sees smuggling as monopoly-busting - as a challenge to state-sponsored restrictions or taxes on trade.

Methods

In smuggling, concealment can involve concealing the smuggled goods on a person's clothing, luggage or inside a body cavity. Some smugglers hide  the whole transportation vehicle or ship used to bring the items into an area. Avoiding border checks, such as by small ships, private airplanes, through overland smuggling routes, smuggling tunnels and even small submersibles. This also applies for illegally passing a border oneself, for illegal immigration or illegal emigration. In many parts of the world, particularly the Gulf of Mexico, the smuggling vessel of choice is the go-fast boat.

Submitting to border checks with the goods or people hidden in a vehicle or between (other) merchandise, or the goods hidden in luggage, in or under clothes, inside the body (see body cavity search, balloon swallower and mule), etc. Many smugglers fly on regularly scheduled airlines. A large number of suspected smugglers are caught each year by customs worldwide. Goods and people are also smuggled across seas hidden in containers, and overland hidden in cars, trucks, and trains. A related topic is illegally passing a border oneself as a stowaway. The high level of duty levied on alcohol and tobacco in Britain has led to large-scale smuggling from France to the UK through the Channel Tunnel.
The combination of acknowledged corruption at the border and high import tariffs led smugglers in the 1970s and ‘80s to fly electronic equipment such as stereos and televisions in cargo planes from one country to clandestine landing strips in another, thereby circumventing encounters at the frontier between countries.

For illegally passing a border oneself, another method is with a false passport (completely fake, or illegally changed, or the passport of a lookalike).

At Border checkpoints, especially for shipping cargo, Border agents must inspect cargo for smuggled and illegal goods. However, because of what is called Gridlock a maximum of 5% inspections per cargo holds worldwide. Since it can take a proper and complete inspection four to six hours, major global trade routes such as Singapore offer great opportunity for smugglers and traders alike. As the leading Cape Town Customs Official argues, if a shipping port stops and inspects every ship it would cause a total shipping grid lock, which is trade gridlock, which is also economic gridlock.  By under-declaring and misrepresenting, even the most surprising goods is common practice when smuggling. What popular culture doesn’t communicate, is that illegal drugs and arms are not the bane of customs officers and the ultimate threat to their economy. In reality, the most commonly smuggled items are everyday items one believes to be common and thus causes higher losses in tax revenue. An anonymous shipping agent said that smuggling becomes second nature to businessmen, taking finished products and misrepresenting them to offer the cheapest possible rate. What the majority of people do not realize, is that the media and popular culture focus on criminal organizations as primary smugglers, but in reality legitimate businesses are the biggest offenders. By incorporating their label on merchandise or products, it leaves bias towards their goods as the popular media portrays them as reliable. Smuggling, however, is produced through the very culture of the shipping industry and is affected by institutionalized tariffs and taxes around the world.

The existence of the Multi-Consignment Contraband (MCC) smuggling method (smuggling two or more different types of contraband such as drugs and illegal immigrants or drugs and guns at the same time) was verified following the completion of a study that found 16 documented cases of smugglers transporting more than one type of contraband in the same shipment. MCC shipments were frequently associated with Phase II and Phase III smuggling organizations.

Use of animals
In addition to human couriers, smugglers have been known to transport illicit goods with the use of trained animals. One advantage to smugglers using animals is that unlike human couriers, who might turn state's evidence if caught, an animal courier, if caught with any contraband on them, would be unable to provide any verbal information to the authorities.

Dogs
One way that smugglers have used animals to transport contraband at times is through the use of dogs. Often smugglers have been known to strap drugs onto the backs of canine and then use such dogs as pack animals to transport the contraband across further distances and/or across borders.

Cats
Another way smugglers have used to transport contraband on multiple occasions is cats. Usually the cats are used to sneak drugs into prisons, where prison gangs can then sell the drugs to other inmates. Often a smuggler from the outside will attach small amounts of drugs to a cat and then the cat will either be lured inside the prison by inmates with cat treats or the cat might be trained to enter the prison. In addition to drugs, cats have also been used to smuggle other kinds of contraband into prison such as cellphones, tools, batteries and phone chargers. The reason why cats can make good drug couriers is due to the fact that felines are naturally stealthy animals and because the prison guards are often less likely to suspect that contraband might be on a cat.

Birds
Additionally smugglers have also used homing pigeons to transport contraband by air at times. Carrier pigeons have been used to smuggle drugs into prisons and across borders. Additionally homing pigeons have also been used to transport cellphones and SIM cards into prisons. The reason why pigeons have been useful for smugglers, is that they can fly for long distances and because the birds are usually unlikely to arouse much suspicion from authorities, due to the fact that pigeons are such widespread and commonly witnessed birds, in both rural and urban areas.

Livestock
Smugglers have also been known to transport contraband with the use of livestock. One such example is the use of horses, donkeys, mules and ponies. The traffickers often strap the illicit goods to the packhorses pack saddle, so that the animal can carry more loads of contraband across further and/or more rugged terrain then a human courier. In addition to Packhorses, Smugglers have also been known to transport contraband with the use of horse-drawn vehicles. Additionally there are also livestock that smugglers have used as living body couriers, in such instances the animals are either made to swallow the drugs or the drugs are surgically implanted inside the animals before they are herded to another destination, at a later date when the animals are slaughtered for their meat, the drugs are then removed and given to associates. One such example is the use of cattle. Cattle have been used as 'body couriers' to transport contraband in multiple ways, often by inserting the drugs into the cattle, to be removed at a later time after slaughter. Another animal that traffickers have used as body couriers are goats, which they remove drugs from after slaughter. Additionally another animal that has been used by smugglers to transport contraband are sheep. Often times, the traffickers either attach the drugs to the sheeps wool or they insert the drugs inside the sheep to be removed at a later date after slaughter. What type of livestock and/or pack animals organized criminals use to carry contraband, often depends on availability and region. For example, in parts of South America, traffickers have used llamas as pack animals to transport drugs across rugged terrain and/or across borders. In certain parts of Asia, elephants have been used as pack animals to carry large amounts of drugs across wilderness areas and/or across borders. In Middle Eastern countries, smugglers have also been known to use camels as pack animals to transport drugs across further distances and/or across borders.

Legal definition
In popular perception smuggling is synonymous with illegal trade. Even social scientists have misconstrued smuggling as illegal trade. While the two have indeed identical objectives, namely the evasion of taxes and the importation of contraband items, their demand and cost functions are altogether different requiring different analytical framework. As a result, illegal trade through customs stations is differently considered, and smuggling is defined as international trade through ‘unauthorized route’. A seaport, airport or land port which has not been authorized by the government for importation and exportation is an ‘unauthorized route’. The legal definition of these occurs in the Customs Act of the country. Notably, some definitions define any 'undeclared' trafficking of currency and precious metal as smuggling. Smuggling is a cognizable offense in which both the smuggled goods and the goods are punishable.

See also
Arms trafficking
Battle of Mudeford
Carding (fraud)
Cigarette smuggling
Counterfeiting
Daigou
French Connection
Iron Law of Prohibition
Pizza Connection Trial
Rescates
Rum-running
Snakehead (gang)
The Yogurt Connection

References

Further reading

 Andreas, Peter. Smuggler Nation: How Illicit Trade Made America. (New York: Oxford University Press, 2013).
 Cohen, Andrew Wender. Contraband: Smuggling and the Birth of the American Century. (New York: W.W. Norton, 2015).
 Cole, W. A. “Trends in Eighteenth-Century Smuggling.” Economic History Review 10#3  1958, pp. 395–410. online in Britain
 Díaz, George T. Border Contraband: A History of Smuggling across the Rio Grande (University of Texas Press, 2015) xiv, 241 pp. excerpt
 Graham, Frank, Smuggling in Cornwall (Newcastle upon Tyne, V. Graham, 1964).
 Graham, Frank, Smuggling in Devon (Newcastle upon Tyne, Frank Graham, 1968).
 Harper, Charles G., Smugglers: Picturesque chapters in the Story of an Ancient Craft (Newcastle upon Tyne, Frank Graham, 1966)
 Harvey, Simon, Smuggling: Seven Centuries of Contraband (London: Reaktion Books, 2016).
 Jones, Evan T., 'Illicit business: accounting for smuggling in mid-sixteenth century Bristol', Economic History Review, 54 (2001). Winner of the Economic History Society's "T.S. Ashton Prize" in 2001, freely available online.
 Jones, Evan T, Inside the Illicit Economy: Reconstructing the Smugglers' Trade of Sixteenth Century Bristol (Ashgate, June 2012)
 Karras, Alan. Smuggling: Contraband and Corruption in World History (Lanham, Rowman and Littlefield, 2010) 199 pp.

 Karson, Lawrence. American Smuggling as White Collar Crime. (New York: Routledge, 2014).
 Morley, Geoffrey, Smuggling in Hampshire & Dorset 1700-1850 (Newbury: Countryside Books, 1983). .
 Rattenbury, John, Memoirs of a Smuggler (Newcastle upon Tyne, V. Graham, 1964).
 Smith, Joshua M., Borderland Smuggling: Patriots, Loyalists and Illicit Trade in the Northeast, 1783–1820 (Gainesville, University Press of Florida, 2006). .
 Waugh, Mary, Smuggling in Kent and Sussex 1700–1840 (Countryside Books, 1985, updated 2003). .

 
Black markets
Prison-related crime
Organized crime